In the social sciences, methodological individualism is the principle that subjective individual motivation explains social phenomena, rather than class or group dynamics which are illusory or artificial and therefore cannot truly explain market or social phenomena. This concept was introduced as an assumption in the social sciences by Max Weber, and discussed in his book Economy and Society. 

Methodological individualism is often contrasted with methodological holism and methodological pluralism.

In economics 
In neoclassical economics, people's behavior is explained in terms of rational choices as constrained by prices and incomes. The neoclassical economist accepts individuals' preferences as given. Gary Becker and George Stigler provide a forceful statement of this view:
On the traditional view, an explanation of economic phenomena that reaches a difference in tastes between people or times is the terminus of the argument: the problem is abandoned at this point to whoever studies and explains tastes (psychologists? anthropologists? phrenologists? sociobiologists?). On our preferred interpretation, one never reaches this impasse: the economist continues to search for differences in prices or incomes to explain any differences or changes in behavior.

Criticisms 
Economist Mark Blaug has criticized over-reliance on methodological individualism in economics, saying that "it is helpful to note what methodological individualism strictly interpreted [...] would imply for economics. In effect, it would rule out all macroeconomic propositions that cannot be reduced to microeconomic ones [...] this amounts to saying goodbye to almost the whole of received macroeconomics. There must be something wrong with a methodological principle that has such devastating implications".

Similarly, the economist Alan Kirman has critiqued general equilibrium theory and modern economics for its "fundamentally individualistic approach to constructing economic models", and showed that an individualist competitive equilibrium is not necessarily stable or unique. However, stability and uniqueness can be achieved if aggregate variables are added, and as a result he argued "the idea that we should start at the level of the isolated individual is one which we may well have to abandon".

See also 
Austrian School
Praxeology

References

Further reading 
 Agassi, Joseph. "Methodological individualism." The British journal of sociology 11.3 (1960): 244-270.
 Kenneth J. Arrow (1994), "Methodological Individualism and Social Knowledge," American Economic Review, 84(2), pp. 1–9.
 Kaushik Basu (2008), "Methodological Individualism," The New Palgrave Dictionary of Economics, 2nd Edition, New York : Palgrave Macmillan  Abstract.
 Brian Epstein (2009), "Ontological Individualism Reconsidered," Synthese 166(1), pp. 187–213.
 Friedrich A. Hayek (1948), Individualism and Economic Order. University of Chicago Press. 
 Geoffrey Hodgson, (2007) "Meanings of Methodological Individualism", Journal of Economic Methodology 14(2), June, pp. 211–226.
 Harold Kincaid (2008), "Individualism versus Holism," The New Palgrave Dictionary of Economics, 2nd Edition, New York: Palgrave Macmillan  Abstract.
 Steven Lukes (1968), "Methodological Individualism Reconsidered," British Journal of Sociology 19, pp. 119–29.
 Ludwig von Mises, "The Principle of Methodological Individualism", chapt. 2 in Human Action  Eprint.
 Joseph Schumpeter (1909), "On the Concept of Social Value", Quarterly Journal of Economics, 23(2), February, pp. 213–32.
 Lars Udéhn (2002), "The Changing Face of Methodological Individualism", Annual Review of Sociology, 28, pp. 479–507.

External links

Reductionism
Sociological theories
Criticisms of economics
Individualism
Philosophy of social science